Nicole Pircio Nunes Duarte (born 24 July 2002) is a Brazilian rhythmic gymnast. She is the 2021 and 2022 Pan American group all-around champion and the 2019 Pan American Games 3 hoops + 4 clubs champion. She won three gold medals at the 2018 South American Games and at the 2019 South American Championships, and she won four gold medals at the 2022 South American Championships. She represented Brazil at the 2020 Summer Olympics and finished twelfth in qualifications for the group all-around.

Career 
Pircio began rhythmic gymnastics when she was ten years old and was invited to join the Brazilian national team in 2018. At the 2018 South American Games Pircio and her teammates swept the gold medals in the group all-around and both apparatus finals. She competed at the 2018 Pan American Championships where the Brazilian group won the gold medal in 5 balls and the bronze medals in the group all-around and 3 balls + 2 ropes. She then competed at the 2018 World Championships where the Brazilian group finished eighteenth in the all-around.

Pircio and the Brazilian group swept the gold medals at the 2019 South American Championships. She then competed at the 2019 Pan American Games where she won a gold medal in the 3 hoops + 2 clubs event and bronze medals in the group all-around and 5 balls event. Then at the 2019 World Championships in Baku, the Brazilian group placed thirteenth in the all-around.

Pircio competed at the 2021 Pan American Championships in Rio de Janeiro. The group won the gold medal in the group all-around and secured the continental quota place for the 2020 Olympic Games. The group additionally won the gold medals in both the 5 balls and the 3 hoops + 4 clubs event finals. She was selected to compete for Brazil at the 2020 Summer Olympics in the group all-around alongside Beatriz Linhares, Déborah Medrado, Maria Eduarda Arakaki, and Geovanna Santos. They finished twelfth in the qualification round for the group all-around. After the Olympic Games, she competed at the 2021 World Championships where the Brazilian group placed ninth in the all-around. They also finished seventh in the 5 balls final.

Pircio competed at the 2022 South American Championships where the Brazilian group won the gold medals in the team, all-around, 5 hoops, and 3 ribbons + 2 balls. She then competed with Maria Eduarda Arakaki, Déborah Medrado, Gabrielle da Silva, Giovanna Oliveira, and Bárbara Galvão at the 2022 Pan American Championships and successfully defended their group all-around title. They also won gold in the 5 hoops event finals, and they won the silver behind Mexico in the 3 ribbons + 2 balls final. The same group then competed at the 2022 World Championships in Sofia where they finished fifth in the group all-around. They also qualified for the 5 hoops final where they finished fourth.

References

External links

2002 births
Living people
Brazilian rhythmic gymnasts
Pan American Games medalists in gymnastics
Pan American Games gold medalists for Brazil
Pan American Games bronze medalists for Brazil
Gymnasts at the 2019 Pan American Games
Medalists at the 2019 Pan American Games
Gymnasts at the 2020 Summer Olympics
Olympic gymnasts of Brazil
People from Piracicaba
Sportspeople from São Paulo (state)
21st-century Brazilian women
South American Games gold medalists for Brazil
South American Games medalists in gymnastics
Competitors at the 2018 South American Games